Stigmella leucargyra is a moth of the family Nepticulidae. It is only known from the south-eastern coast of New South Wales, Australia.

The wingspan is about 3.7 mm for males and 4-4.2 mm for females.

The larvae feed on Correa reflexa. They mine the leaves of their host plant. The mine consists of an irregular contorted gallery in the leaf.

Larvae where found in July and August. Adults emerged in early September. The larvae are bright green with a blackish head.

External links
Australian Faunal Directory
Australian Nepticulidae (Lepidoptera): Redescription of the named species

Nepticulidae
Moths of Australia
Moths described in 1906